Bhutnath Saren was an MLA of Nayagram Vidhan Sabha constituency from Communist Party of India(Marxist).

References

1980 births
Living people